The USA International Harp Competition was  founded in 1989 by harpist and pedagogue Susann McDonald. It is the only international harp competition held in the United States, and it is one of only seven music competitions in the United States to belong to the World Federation of International Music Competitions.

The Competition is held every three years at the Jacobs School of Music on the campus of Indiana University and is open to harpists of all nationalities ages 18 to 32. Since its inception, over 300 harpists from 19 countries have competed for this coveted title. In addition to helping launch careers, the Competition offers impressive prizes including a commemorative, Concert Grand Gold Harp designed and built specifically for the USA IHC by Lyon & Healy Harps. Cash prizes are also awarded through eighth place.

Winners

2022
First Prize – Noël Wan
Second Prize – Huw Boucher
Third Prize – Hyejin Kim

2019
First Prize – Mélanie Laurent
Second Prize – Valerio Lisci
Third Prize – Mathilde Wauters

2016
First Prize – Katherine Siochi
Second Prize – Elizabeth Bass
Third Prize – Lenka Petrovic

2013
First Prize – Remy van Kesteren
Second Prize – Marta Marinelli
Third Prize – Emily Levin

2010
First Prize – Agnès Clément
Second Prize – Rino Kageyama
Third Prize – Vasilisa Lushchevskaya

2007
First Prize – Maria Krushevskaya
Second Prize – Hanako Hirano
Third Prize – Coline-Marie Orliac

2004
First Prize – Emmanuel Ceysson
Second Prize – Julie Ann Smith
Third Prize – Lavinia Meijer

2001
First Prize – Dan Yu
Second Prize – Maria Luisa Rayán
Third Prize – Julie Ann Smith

1998
First Prize – Xavier de Maistre
Second Prize – Maria Luisa Rayán
Third Prize – Kyo-jin Lee

1995
First Prize – Gaëlle Vandernoot
Second Prize – Marie-Pierre Langlamet
Third Prize – Gaëlle Thouvenin

1992
First Prize – Jana Boušková
Second Prize – Beatrice Guillermin
Third Prize – Nika Riabchinenko

1989
First Prize – Maria Casale
Second Prize – Elizabeth Hainen
Third Prize – Kirsten Agresta

References

External links

Harp competitions
Music competitions in the United States